Mark Allan Gilliver (born 18 June 1969) is a former English cricketer. Gilliver was a right-handed batsman who bowled right-arm off break. He was born in Upper Agbrigg, Yorkshire.

Gilliver represented the Yorkshire Cricket Board in List A cricket. His debut List A match came against Buckinghamshire in the 1999 NatWest Trophy. From 1999 to 2001, he represented the Board in 4 List A matches, the last of which came against the Northamptonshire Cricket Board in the 2001 Cheltenham & Gloucester Trophy.  In his 4 List A matches, he scored 98 runs at a batting average of 24.50, with a high score of 48. In the field he took a single catch.

References

External links
Mark Gilliver at Cricinfo
Mark Gilliver at CricketArchive

1969 births
Living people
Cricketers from Yorkshire
Yorkshire Cricket Board cricketers